William Milnes Jr. (December 8, 1827 – August 14, 1889) was a nineteenth-century congressman and industrialist from Virginia and Pennsylvania.

Biography

Born in Yorkshire, England, Milnes immigrated to the United States with his family in 1829, settling in Pottsville, Pennsylvania. He attended public schools as a child, going on to learning trade in machinery. He engaged in mining and coal shipping before moving to Shenandoah, Virginia in 1865 and engaged in the iron business. Milnes was a member of the Virginia House of Delegates in 1870 and 1871 and was elected a Conservative to the United States House of Representatives in 1869, serving from 1870 to 1871. Afterwards, he resumed in engaging in the iron business until his death in Shenandoah, Virginia on August 14, 1889. He was interred in the family plot in the Methodist Church Cemetery, Shenandoah, Virginia.

Election of 1869
Milnes was elected to the U.S. House of Representatives unopposed.

External links

1827 births
1889 deaths
Members of the Virginia House of Delegates
Members of the United States House of Representatives from Virginia
Politicians from Pottsville, Pennsylvania
People from Shenandoah, Virginia
British emigrants to the United States
Conservative Party of Virginia politicians
Conservative Party of Virginia members of the United States House of Representatives
19th-century American politicians